The Revenge of Spartacus or La vendetta di Spartacus (US title: Revenge of the Gladiators) is a 1965 Italian film directed by Michele Lupo.  It was shot back to back with Seven Slaves Against the World.

Plot
Arminio and Trasone do believe that the legendary Spartacus is still alive and has organized a group of armed men to destroy the Romans . Valerio, a Roman legionary, discovers the deception and attempts to warn those who believe in the false news. The attempt is unsuccessful . After killing the two Spartacists, Valerio and his followers fought against the remaining forces of Arminius, defeating them after a bitter battle.

Cast
Roger Browne as Valerio
Scilla Gabel as Cinzia
Giacomo Rossi-Stuart as Fulvius
Daniele Vargas as Lucius Transone
Germano Longo as Marcellus
Gianni Solaro
Franco Di Trocchio
Gian Paolo Rosmino	(as Giampaolo Rosmino)
Alfio Caltabiano
Pietro Ceccarelli
Pietro Marascalchi
Mario Novelli
Nello Pazzafini (as Giovanni Pazzafini)
Calisto Calisti
Antonio Corevi
Gordon Mitchell (as Arminius)

Notes

External links
 

1965 films
Peplum films
1960s Italian-language films
Films scored by Francesco De Masi
Films set in ancient Rome
Films set in the 1st century BC
Films about gladiatorial combat
Sword and sandal films
1960s Italian films